Strictly Jewish: The Secret World of Adass Israel is a 2016 Australian documentary film on the Haredi Jewish community in Melbourne, Australia. The documentary was directed by film-maker Danny Ben-Moshe, and aired on the SBS Australian television channel as part of its "Untold Australia" series.

The film centers on the Adass Israel community in Melbourne which is described as an Haredi Jewish "sect". The format of the film follows three community members who explain their faith and way of life.

See also 
 Welcome to the Waks Family
 A Life Apart: Hasidism in America

References 

Films about Orthodox and Hasidic Jews
2016 documentary films
2010s Australian films